Victor Brooks (11 November 1918 – 19 January 2000) was a prolific English film and television actor.  He specialised in character roles, police inspectors in particular, in British thrillers such as Cover Girl Killer (1959), Witchcraft (1964), and Devils of Darkness (1965). 
In 1961, he narrated the fifteen minute instructional Short, 'The Warden, His Duties and Training'.
He also appeared in eight of the thirty-two episodes of 1964's 'Open House', playing himself, and The Host.
 

His best known films are probably Goldfinger (1964), The Brides of Dracula (1960) and Billy Budd (1962). On television, he was noted for playing a pipe-smoking authority figure in crime series like Dixon of Dock Green, Gideon's Way, Detective, Z Cars and Crown Court. He also appeared in the television series Raffles, in the recurring role of the Albany porter.

Selected filmography
Film

 The Hostage (1956) – Inspector Clifford
 These Dangerous Years (1957)
 No Time for Tears (1957) – Mr. Harris
 The Scamp (1957) – Inspector Birch
 The Birthday Present (1957) – 2nd Reception Officer (uncredited)
 The One That Got Away (1957) – Police Sergeant (uncredited)
 Innocent Sinners (1958) – Inspector Russell (uncredited)
 The Moonraker (1958) – Blacksmith
 The Long Knife (1958) – Supt Leigh
 The Man Upstairs (1958) – Sergeant Collins
 Further Up the Creek (1958) – Policeman (uncredited)
 Too Many Crooks (1959) Court Usher (uncredited)
 No Trees in the Street (1959) – Bookie's Clerk
 Whirlpool (1959) – Riverman
 Cover Girl Killer (1959) – Inspector Brunner
 The Price of Silence (1959) – Supt. Wilson
 Sapphire (1959) Police Sergeant
 The 39 Steps (1959) Policeman at Accident (uncredited)
 Jackpot (1960) – Sgt. Jacks
 The Trials of Oscar Wilde (1960) – Constable
 The Challenge (1960) – Foreman
 In the Nick (1960) – Screw Smith
 The Brides of Dracula (1960) – Hans
 Follow That Horse! (1960) – Blake
 Offbeat (1961) – Inspector Adams
 Seven Keys (1961) – Discharging Officer (uncredited)
 No My Darling Daughter (1961) – Policeman
 Victim (1961) – Detective (uncredited)
 Play It Cool (1962) – Twist Commissioner (uncredited)
 Crooks Anonymous (1962) – Police Officer
 The Road to Hong Kong (1962) – Leader's Man (uncredited)
 The Inspector (1962) – Sgt. Groninger
 The Day of the Triffids (1962) – Poiret
 The Brain (1962) – Farmer at Crash Site (uncredited)
 The Wild and the Willing (1962) – Fire Chief
 Billy Budd (1962) – Amos Leonard – First Mate, Rights of Man
 The Fast Lady (1963) – Policeman
 The Yellow Teddy Bears (1963) – George Donaghue
 Doctor in Distress (1963) – Police Constable (uncredited)
 80,000 Suspects (1963) – Health Inspector Collins (uncredited)
 Witchcraft (1964) – Inspector Baldwin
 The Eyes of Annie Jones (1964) – Sgt. Henry
 Goldfinger (1964) – Blacking
 Devils of Darkness (1965) – Inspector Hardwick
 The Murder Game (1965) – Rev Francis Hood
 Arthur! Arthur! (1969) – Bit Part (uncredited)
 Burke & Hare (1972) – Butler
 Give Us Tomorrow (1978) – Superintendent Ogilvie
 The Dallas Connection (1994) – Charlie (final film role)

Television
 Sergeant Cork (1963–1964) – Yates / Sgt. Dempsey
 Dixon of Dock Green (1964–1967) – Gaoler / Sgt. Cox / Sgt. Barrett
 Gideon's Way (1965) – Supt. Ridgeway
 Z-Cars (1967–1969) – Sgt. Potter / Sergeant
 Raffles (1977) – Albany Porter

References

External links
 

1918 births
2000 deaths
English male film actors
English male television actors
Male actors from London
20th-century English male actors